Nicolas de Barry is a French perfumer.

Born in 1948 (Paris, France), Nicolas de Barry studied both sociology and politics (PhD Sorbonne University, Paris).  Before focusing on perfumery, he has published books in French under the name Nicolas Martin : La Prusse rouge (Presses de la Cité, 1973), La Méditerranée  (Editions L'Appel, 1974), Senghor et le monde (Editions ABC,1979), La forteresse albanaise (Editions Fayolle, 1979), ainsi que "La France fortifiée" (Editions Nathan) et "L'armée parle" (Editions Fayard). The first time he signed with the name De Barry was when he has created a choreography for a play of the French artist Dominique Tron : D'épuisement en épuisement jusqu'à l'aurore, Elisabeth . Nicolas Martin de Barry was awarded a "Prix d'Histoire de l'Académie Française" before starting the perfumery in 1992.

His encounters with Edmond Roudnitska (Diorissimo and Eau Sauvage), Françoise Marin, the director of Givaudan-Roure Perfumery School in Grasse, and Rodrique Romani, gave birth to his commitment to perfumery.

In Brazil, he became the perfumer of the "high society" for whom he made exclusive fragrances.
In France he bought the Château de Frileuse near Blois in the Loire Valley where he has set up a perfume Atelier and a garden of scents. de Barry also organizes workshops and Master Classes worldwide.

He is the author of several books on perfumery and cosmetics:
« L' ABCdaire du parfum »("The ABCs of perfumes "), Flammarion, with G. Vindry and M. Turonnet (translated in Portuguese and Italian);
« Des parfums à faire soi-même »("Make your own perfumes"), Minerva (translated in Portuguese);
« L' Inde des parfums » (" India, country of fragrances "), Garde-Temps.
« L’ ABCdaire de l’huile d’olive » (« The little book of olive oil »), Flammarion.

He is visiting professor at Montpellier University (France) and also general secretary of the 'Prix International du ParfumFFsince 2000. He has been awarded a "Chevalier des Arts et Lettres" by the French Minister of Culture, Frédéric Mitterrand.

Products 
 Natural perfumes

For several years Nicolas de Barry has focused on the research and creation of natural perfumes. For example, Aloes (also called Aquilaria, Agarwood, Kyara, Oud) is found in South Thailand, the blue Lotus comes from Thailand too, the Rose from Grasse has a limited production since it is grown on less than 7 acres, the Osmanthus, Jasmin Sambac and Chinese rose from Guilin.
 Historical perfumes

For each of his specialties de Barry did historical research including archival correspondence which allowed him to recreate these fragrances.
Georges Sand used Patchouli and Bergamot, Queen Margot used Jasmine-Ambre gris –Musk, King Louis XV and Marquise de Pompadour a “bouquet”, Empress Sissi from Austria used Violet, etc.
 Master classes

Barry conducts Master Classes in his Val de Loire château and abroad.

References 
<International Pressbook>
http://nicolasdebarry.blogspot.com/search/label/le%20press%20book

<German TV program : Euromaxx (gr. Deutsche Welle) >
<https://www.youtube.com/watch?v=PX8cS6dlwY8>

External links 
 www.nicolasdebarry.com
 http://nicolasdebarry.blogspot.com
 www.chateau-de-frileuse.com
 http://prixinternationalduparfum.blogspot.com
 http://www.mimifroufrou.com/scentedsalamander/2006/06/scented_paths_fragrant_address_4.html
 http://www.mimifroufrou.com/scentedsalamander/2008/11/dominique_ropion_awarded_inter.html
 http://1.bp.blogspot.com/_jjqN1cXEv2o/ShKjpA-AVtI/AAAAAAAABBk/qnHzDtlcYL0/s1600-h/Germany+-+die+Welt+Icon+Lifestyle.jpg
 https://www.instagram.com/nicolasdebarry/ Social 

French perfumers
Living people
Year of birth missing (living people)